WVTR may refer to:

 Water vapor transmission rate
 WVTR (FM), a radio station in Roanoke, Virginia, United States